The Singapore International Film Festival (SGIFF) is an annual film festival held every year in Singapore. Founded in 1987, the festival is one of the most significant film festivals in Asia. Besides the competition feature and short film screenings, film industry-related activities such as exhibitions, workshops and seminars are also part of the official SGIFF programme.

The Silver Screen Awards Competition was introduced in 1991 to encourage advances in Asian film-making standards. Every year, a selection of Asian feature and short films take part in the competition. In 2014, the Southeast Asian Short Film category was introduced, replacing the Singapore Short Film category. The first Southeast Asian Film Lab was introduced in 2015.

Past winners
The director's name and country of production are in parentheses.

1991 Silver Screen Awards
Best Asia Feature: Black Republic (South Korea, Park Kwang-su)
Special Jury Prize: The Man from Island West (Taiwan, Huang Mingchuan)

Singapore Short Film Category:
Best Film: August (Eric Khoo)
Special Jury Prize: The Cage (K. Subramanyam)

1992 Silver Screen Awards
Best Asia Feature: Life on a String (China, Chen Kaige)
Special Jury Prize: The Ferry (Kadavu) (India, M. T. Vasudevan Nair)
Best Director: Edward Yang, A Brighter Summer Day

Singapore Short Film Category:
Special Jury Prize: Waves of a Distant Shore (Meng Ong)
Best Director: Meng Ong, Waves of a Distant Shore

1993 Silver Screen Awards
Best Asian Feature: The Peach Blossom Land (Stan Lai, Taiwan)
Special Jury Prize: Hill of no Return (Wang Tung, Taiwan)
Best Director: Stan Lai, The Peach Blossom Land
Best Actress: Yang Kwei-mei, Hill of No Return
NETPAC-FIPRESCI Award: The Peach Blossom Land (Stan Lai, Taiwan)

Singapore Short Film Category:
Special Jury Prize: Ragged (Nisar and Nazir Husain)
Best Director: Meng Ong, Buddha's Garden

1994 Silver Screen Awards
Best Asia Feature: Sopyonje (Im Kwon-taek, South Korea)
Special Jury Prize: Rebels of the Neon God (Tsai Ming-Liang, Taiwan)
Special Jury Prize: Beijing Bastards (Zhang Yuan, China)
Special Jury mention: The Servile (Adoor Gopalakrishnan, India)
Best Director: Tian Zhuangzhuang (The Blue Kite, China)
Best Actor: Amrish Puri (Seventh Horse of the Sun, India)
Best Actress: Lü Liping, The Blue Kite
NETPAC-FIPRESCI Award: The Servile (Adoor Gopalakrishnan, India)

Singapore Short Film Category:
Best Film: Ethos (Dominic Christopher Pereira); Married (Chee Kong Cheah (CheeK))
Best Director, Special Achievement Award: Pain (Eric Khoo)
Special Jury Prize: Hurt Instinct (Nisar and Nazir Husain)
Special Jury Prize: Eddy (Dzulkilfi Sungit, Remi Mohamed)

1995 Silver Screen Awards
Best Asian Feature: Vive l'Amour (Taiwan, Tsai Ming-Liang)
Special Jury Prize: Postman (China, He Jianjun)
Best Actor: Xia Yu, In the Heat of the Sun
Best Actress: Yang Kwei-Mei, Vive l'Amour
NETPAC - FIPRESCI Award: A Borrowed Life (Taiwan, Wu Nien-jen)
NETPAC - FIPRESCI Special Mention: Mee Pok Man (Singapore, Eric Khoo)

Singapore Short Film Category:
Special Jury Prize: I Can't Sleep Tonight  (K. Rajagopal)

1996 Silver Screen Awards
Best Asian Feature: Cardiogram (Kazakhstan, Darezhan Omirbayev)
Special Jury Prize: On the Beat (China, Ning Ying)
Best Director: Edward Yang, Mahjong
Best Actor: Bishnu Kharghoria, It's a Long Way to the Sea (Xagoroloi Bohudoor) (India, Jahnu Barua)
Special Achievement Award: Good Men, Good Women (Taiwan, Hou Hsiao-hsien)
NETPAC-FIPRESCI Award: Good Men, Good Women
NETPAC-FIPRESCI Special Mention: It's a Long Way to the Sea

Singapore Short Film Category:
Best Film: A Moveable Feast (Sandi Tan)
Best Director: Lim Suat Yen, Sense of Home
Special Jury Prize: The Glare (K. Rajagopal)
Special Achievement Award: Sense of Home (Lim Suat Yen)

1997 Silver Screen Awards
Best Asian Feature: Gabbeh (Iran, Mohsen Makhmalbaf)
Special Jury Prize: The River (Taiwan, Tsai Ming-liang)
Best Director: Wu Tianming, The King of Masks
Best Actor: Miao Tien, The River
Best Actress: Machiko Ono, Suzaku (Japan, Naomi Kawase)
NETPAC-FIPRESCI Award: 12 Storeys (Singapore, Eric Khoo)

Singapore Short Film Category:
Best Film: Beansprouts and Salted Fish (Chee Kong Cheah (CheeK))
Best Director: Norman on the Air (Wee Li Lin)
Special Jury Prize: Absence (K. Rajagopal)
Special Achievement Award: Beansprouts and Salted Fish (Chee Kong Cheah (CheeK))

1998 Silver Screen Awards
Best Asian Feature: Children of the Heaven (Iran, Majid Majidi)
Special Jury Prize: Ayneh (The Mirror) (Iran, Jafar Panahi)
Best Director: Jafar Panahi, Ayneh (The Mirror)
UOB Young Cinema Award: Wolves Cry Under the Moon (Taiwan, Ho Ping)
Best Actor: Sunny CHAN Kam Hung, Hold You Tight
Best Actress: Nita Fernando, Walls Within
NETPAC/FIPRESCI Award: In the Navel of the Sea (The Philippines, Marilou Diaz-Abaya)
NETPAC/FIPRESCI Special Mention: Hold You Tight (Stanley Kwan)

Singapore Short Film Category:
Best Film: By the Dawn's Early Rise (Ong Lay Jinn)
Best Director: Jack Neo, Replacement Killers

1999 Silver Screen Awards
Best Asian Feature: The Hole (Taiwan, Tsai Ming-Liang)
Special Jury Prize: Connection by Fate (Taiwan, Wan Jen)
Special Mention: The Adopted Son (Beshkempir), (Kyrgyzstan/France, Aktan Abdykalykov)
Best Director: Tsai Ming-Liang, The Hole
Best Screenplay: Ikinai (Japan, Minoru Iizuka)
Best Actor: Joe Abeywickrama, Pura Handa Kaluwara
Best Actress: Yang Kwei-Mei, The Hole
NETPAC-FIPRESCI Awards: Connection by Fate (Wan Jen)
NETPAC-FIPRESCI Special Mention: Beshkempir (Aktan Abdykalykov)
NETPAC-FIPRESCI Special Mention: The Power of Kangwon Province (South Korea, Hong Sang-soo)
SFC Young Cinema Award: Beshkempir (Aktan Abdykalykov)

Singapore Short Film Category:
Best Film: Datura (Abdul Nizam)
Best Director: Tay Hui Ngi, Pariah's Diary
Special Jury Prize: TMIUS (Shermeen Ng)
Special Achievement Award: Another Guy (Wee Li Lin)
Special Mention: Doh laai tin sai (Edwin Yeo)
Special Mention: Please Use Stairs (Victric Thng Hui Leong)

2000 Silver Screen Awards
Best Asia Feature: Darkness And Light (Taiwan, Chang Tso-chi)
Special Jury Prize: Split Wide Open (India, Dev Benegal)
Best Director: Zhang Yuan, Seventeen Years
SFC Young Cinema Award: Eating Air (Singapore, Jasmine Ng and Kelvin Tong)
Best Actor: Rahul Bose, Split Wide Open
Best Actress: Liu Lin and Li Bingbing, Seventeen Years
Best Screenplay: Aos Gitai and Eliette Abecassis, Kadosh (Sacred) (Israel, Aos Gitai)
NETPAC-FIPRESCI Award: Darkness and Light
NETPAC-FIPRESCI Award: So Close to Paradise (China, Wang Xiaoshuai)

Singapore Short Film Category:
Best Film: Sons (Royston Tan)
Special Jury Prize: Wait (Kwong Chee Guan Boi)
Special Achievement Award: Sons (Royston Tan)

2001 Silver Screen Awards
Best Asian Feature: Eureka (Japan, Shinji Aoyama)
Special Jury Prize: Clouds of May (Turkey, Nuri Bilge Ceylan)
SFC Young Cinema Award: Platform (China, Jia Zhangke)
SFC Young Cinema Award: This is My Moon (Sri Lanka, Asoka Handagama)
Best Director: Im Kwon-taek, Chunhyang
Best Actor: Ibrahim Kadir, A Poet
Best Actress: Nguyen Lan Huong, The House of Guavas
NETPAC/FIPRESCI Award: A Poet (Indonesia, Garin Nugroho)
NETPAC/FIPRESCI Special mention: This is My Moon (Sri Lanka, Asoka Handagama)

Singapore Short Film Category:

 No awards were given for Best Film and Best Director
Special Achievement Award: eAHLONG.COM (Colin Goh)

2002 Silver Screen Award
Best Asian Feature: Batang West Side (The Philippines, Lav Diaz)
Special Jury Prize: Seafood (China/Hong Kong, Zhu Wen)
Young Cinema Award: Eliana, Eliana (Indonesia, Riri Riza)
Best Director: Semih Kaplanoglu, Away From Home
Best Actor: Jia Hongsheng, Quitting
Best Actress: Dian Sastrowardoyo, Whispering Sands
NETPAC/FIPRESCI Award: Eliana, Eliana (Riri Riza)
NETPAC/FIPRESCI Special Mention: I-San Special (Thailand, Mingmongkol Sonakul)

Singapore Short Film Category:
Best Film: The Call Home (Han Yew Kwang)
Special Jury Prize: Eve of Adha (Leonard Yip)
Best Director: Sun Koh Boon Luang, The Secret Heaven
Special Achievement Award: 15 (Royston Tan)

Asian Digital Film Awards:
Critics Prize: Lost (Malaysia, Amir Muhammad)
Audience Prize: In Search of Afghanistan (Singapore, Melvinder Kanth, Ismail bin Ishak)

2003 Silver Screen Awards
Best Asian Feature: The Best of Times (Taiwan, Chang Tso-chi)
Special Jury Prize: Flying With One Wing (Sri Lanka, Asoka Handagama)
Special Mention: Unknown Pleasures (China/Japan/France, Jia Zhangke)
Best Director: Angel On The Right (Tajikistan, Djamshed Usmonov)
Best Actor: Wing Fan, The Best of Times
Best Actress: Anoma Janadari, Flying With One Wing
Young Cinema Award: Blissfully Yours (Thailand, Apichatpong Weerasethakul)
NETPAC-FIPRESCI Award: 15 - The Movie (Singapore, Royston Tan)

Singapore Short Film Category:

 No awards were given for Best Film, Best Director and Special Jury Prize
Special Achievement Award: Autograph Book (Wee Li Lin)

2004 Silver Screen Awards
Best Asian Feature: Uzak (Turkey, Nuri Bilge Ceylan)
Special Jury Prize: Vibrator (Japan, Ryūichi Hiroki)
Best Director: Nuri Bilge Ceylan, Uzak
Young Cinema Award: Panj é asr (At Five In The Afternoon) (Iran, Samira Makhmalbaf)
Best Actor: Mehmet Emin Toprak, Uzak
Best Actress: Terashima Shinobu, Vibrator
NETPAC-FIPRESCI Award: August Sun (Sri Lanka, Prasanna Vithanage)

Singapore Short Film Category:

 No award was given for Best Film
Best Director: Conflict and Crisis (Students of CHIJ (Toa Payoh) under Mr Tan Wil-Kie)
Special Jury Prize: Innocent (Gek Li San, Ho Choon Hiong)
Special Achievement Award: Innocent (Gek Li San, Ho Choon Hiong)

2005 Silver Screen Awards
Best Asian Feature: Underexposure (Iraq/Germany, Oday Rasheed)
Special Jury Prize: Tropical Malady (Thailand/France/Italy, Apichatpong Weerasethakul)
Best Director: Lee Yoon-ki, This Charming Girl
Young Cinema Award: Green Hat (Hong Kong, Liu Fendou)
Best Actor: (tie) Liao Fan and Li Congxi, Green Hat
Best Actress: Kim Ji-soo, This Charming Girl
Best Actress: Ho Phuong Dung, A Time Far Past
NETPAC/FIPRESCI Award: Stray Dogs (Iran, Marziyeh Meshkini)

Singapore Short Film Category:
Best Film: A Family Portrait (Boo Junfeng)
Best Director: Subtitle (Gavin Lim)
Special Jury Prize: Elephant: OK (Srinivas Bhakta)
Special Achievement Award: A Family Portrait (Boo Junfeng)

2006 Silver Screen Awards
Best Asian Feature: It's Only Talk (Ryūichi Hiroki, Japan)
Best Director: Kelvin Tong, Love Story
Special Jury Prize: Gie (Riri Riza, Indonesia)
Best Actor: Elijah Castillo, Pepot Superstar
Best Actress: Hanan Tork, Kiss Me Not on the Eyes
NETPAC/FIPRESCI Award: Todo todo teros (John Torres, Philippines)
NETPAC/FIPRESCI Award: Taking Father Home (Ying Liang, China)

Singapore Short Film Category:
Best Film: Quietly (Oon Jit Fong)
Best Director: Kam Leong Huat, Di (Little Brother)
Special Jury Prize: 10 Minutes Later (Kirsten Tan)
Special Achievement Award: Where Is Singapore? (Kelly Ling)

2007 Silver Screen Awards
Best Asian Feature: Opera Jawa (Garin Nugroho, Indonesia)
Best Director: Shawkat Amin Korki, Crossing the Dust
Special Jury Prize: The Other Half (Ying Liang, China)
Best Actor: Carlos Chahine, The Last Man
Best Actress: Han Hyo-joo, Ad-lib Night
NETPAC Award: Crossing the Dust (Shawkat Amin Korki, Iraq)
NETPAC Award: Like a Virgin (Lee Hae-young, Lee Hae-jun, South Korea)

Singapore Short Film Category:
Best Film: Conversations (Tia Quah)
Best Director: Fonzi (Kirsten Tan)
Special Jury Prize: Katong Fugue (Boo Junfeng)
Special Achievement Award: White (Tan Wei Keong)

2008 Silver Screen Awards

Best Asian Feature: Slingshot (Brillante Mendoza, Philippines)
Special Jury Prize: Out of Coverage (Abellatif Abdelhamid, Syria)
Best Director: Brillante Mendoza, Slinghshot
Best Performance: Inessa Kislova, Swift
NETPAC Award: Slingshot, (Brillante Mendoza, Philippines)

Singapore Short Film Category:
Best Film: Keluar Baris (Boo Junfeng)
Special Jury Prize: Wet Seasons (Michael Tay)
Best Director: Boo Junfeng, Keluar Baris
Special Achievement Award: My Home, My Heaven (Muhammad Eysham Ali)
Best Cinematography: Sharon Loh, Keluar Baris
Best Performance: Magdalene Tan, Silent Girls

2009 Silver Screen Awards
Best Asian Feature: Laila’s Birthday (Palestine)
Best Director: Rasoul Sadr Ameli, Every Night, Loneliness
Best Performance: Yang Ik-june, Breathless
Best Cinematography: Zhang Yi, Jalainur
NETPAC Award - Critic's Prize: Jalainur (Zhao Ye, China)
Special Mention: Blind Pig Who Wants to Fly (Edwin, Indonesia)

Singapore Film Awards:
Best Film: Rule #1 (Kelvin Tong)
Best Director: Royston Tan, 12 Lotus
Best Screenplay: Hashi (Sherman Ong)
Best Performance: Mark Lee, Money No Enough 2
Best Cinematography: Roszali Samad, Brian Gothong Tan, Sharon Loh, Jaye Neo, Cain Chui, Andrew Mark Sobrielo, Chris Yeo and Adrian Lo, Lucky 7

Singapore Short Film Category:
Best Film: Swimming Lesson (Kat Goh)
Best Director: Kat Goh, Swimming Lesson
Best Performance: Cheong Soon Foon, Madam Chan
Best Cinematography: Simon Walsh and David Shiyang Liu, 5 Films in an Anthology of A Film A Month
Special Mention: Hush Baby (Tan Wei Keong)

2010 Silver Screen Awards
Asian Feature Film Category:
Best Film: Sex Volunteer (Cho Kyeong-Duk)
Best Director: Cho Kyeong-Duk, Sex Volunteer
Best Cinematography: Mahsun Kirmizigul, I Saw the Sun (Gunesi Gordum)
Best Performance: Cast of I Saw the Sun (Gunesi Gordum)
NETPAC Critics Award: The Dreamer (Sang Pemimpi) (Riri Riza)

Singapore Short Film Category:
Best Film: Promises in December (Elgin Ho)
Best Director: Elgin Ho, Promises in December
Best Cinematography: Mu Dan (Lincoln Chia)
Best Performance: Li Xie, Mu Dan
Special Mention: Life With Uhmu (Tanya Lai)

2011 Silver Screen Awards
Asian Feature Film Category:
Best Film: Buddha Mountain, Yu Li
Best Director: Heiward Mak, (Beside(s,) happiness)
Best Cinematography: Kim Young-Pil, Rolling Home with a Bull
People's Choice Award: Red Light Revolution, Sam Voutas

Singapore Short Film Category:
Best Film: Hentak Kaki (James Khoo)
Best Director: Kenneth Lee, Band of Mischief
Best Cinematography: Luo Min, Blue Tide
Best Performance: Marc Gabriel Loh, First Breath After Coma
Special Mention: Window of Dreams (Nooraini Shah Sikkander)
Special Achievement: Echoing Love (爱情六重奏) (Edmund Chen)

2014 Silver Screen Awards
Asian Feature Film Category:
Best Film: Court (Chaitanya Tamhane, India)
Special Mention: Alive (Park Jung-bum, South Korea)
Best Director: Chaitanya Tamhane, Court
Best Performance: Sekar Sari, Siti

Southeast Asian Short Film Category:
 Best Southeast Asian Short Film: Dahdi (Granny) (Kirsten Tan, Singapore)
 Best Singapore Short Film: Not Working Today (Shijie Tan)
 Best Director: Aditya Ahmad, On Stopping the Rain
 Special Mention: Vanishing Horizon of the Sea (Chulayarnnon Siriphol, Thailand)

Honorary Award:
 Im Kwon-taek

2015 Silver Screen Awards
Asian Feature Film Category:
Best Film: The Fourth Direction (Gurvinder Singh, India)
Special Mention: Tikkun (Avishai Sivan)
Best Director: Ryusuke Hamaguchi, Happy Hour
Best Performance: Taha Tegin Özdemir, Yakup Özgür Kurtaal and Ömer Uluç, Snow Pirates

Southeast Asian Short Film Category:
 Best Southeast Asian Short Film: The Fox Exploits the Tiger's Might (Lucky Kuswandi, Indonesia)
 Best Singapore Short Film: My Father After Dinner (Gladys Ng)
 Best Director: Lucky Kuswandi, The Fox Exploits the Tiger's Might
 Special Mention: Ferris Wheel (Phuttiphong Aroonpheng, Thailand)
 Youth Jury Prize: Three Wheels (Kavich Neang, Cambodia/France)

Southeast Asian Film Lab:
 Most Promising Project: A-joom-ma (He Shuming, Singapore)

Audience Choice Award:
Sailing a Sinking Sea (Olivia Wyatt, Myanmar/Thailand)

Honorary Award:
 Mohsen Makhmalbaf

Cinema Legend Award:
 Michelle Yeoh

2016 Silver Screen Awards
Asian Feature Film Category:
Best Film: White Sun (Deepak Rauniyar, Nepal/USA)
Special Mention: Leftovers (Wicaksono Wisnu Legowo, Indonesia)
Best Director: Abdullah Mohammad Saad, Live From Dhaka
Best Performance: Mostafa Monwar, Live From Dhaka

Southeast Asian Short Film Category:
 Best Southeast Asian Short Film: In The Year of Monkey (Wregas Bhanuteja, Indonesia)
 Best Singapore Short Film: Anchorage Prohibited (Chiang Wei Liang)
 Best Director: Liao Jiekai, The Mist
 Special Mention: On The Origin of Fear (Bayu Prihantoro Filemon, Indonesia)
 Youth Jury Prize: Still (P.R. Patindol, Philippines)

Southeast Asian Film Lab:
 Most Promising Project: Taste, (Dong Phuong Thao, Vietnam/Singapore)
 Special Mention: Rahula (Puangsoi Aksornsawang)

Audience Choice Award:
Absent Without Leave, (Lau Kek-huat, Taiwan/Malaysia)

Honorary Award:
Fruit Chan

Cinema Legend Award:
 Simon Yam

2017 Silver Screen Awards
Asian Feature Film Category:
Best Film: Disappearance (Ali Asgari, Iran/Qatar)
Best Director: Anucha Boonyawatana, Malila: The Farewell Flower
Best Performance: Sadaf Asgari, Disappearance
 Special Mention: Scaffolding (Matan Yair, Israel/Poland)

Southeast Asian Short Film Category:
 Best Southeast Asian Short Film: Employee of the Month (Jodilerks Dela Cruz) (Carlo Francisco Manatad, Philippines)
 Best Singapore Short Film: Between Us Two (Tan Wei Keong)
 Best Director: Sorayos Prapapan, Death of the Sound Man
 Special Mention: The Malediction (Makbul Mubarak, Indonesia)

Youth Jury & Critics Programme:
 Youth Jury Prize: Death of the Sound Man (Sorayos Prapapan, Thailand)
 Young Critic Award: Joshua Ng Jun Hao, Nanyang Technological University

Southeast Asian Film Lab:
 Most Promising Project: A Useful Ghost (Ratchapoom Boonbunchachoke, Thailand)

Audience Choice Award:
Call Me by Your Name (Luca Guadagnino, Italy/France)

Cinema Legend Award:
 Koji Yakusho

Honorary Award:
 Garin Nugruho

Inspiring woman in film award:
 Ana Urushadze

2018 Silver Screen Awards
Asian Feature Film Category:
Best Film: A Land Imagined (Yeo Siew Hua, Singapore)
Best Director: Pham Thu Hang, The Future Cries Beneath Our Soil
Best Performance: Manoranjoan Das, Bulbul Can Sing
Special Mention: Dayan (Behrouz Nooranipour, Iran)

Southeast Asian Short Film Category:
 Best Southeast Asian Short Film: A Million Years (Danech San, Cambodia)
 Best Singapore Short Film: Luzon (Chiang Wei Liang)
 Best Director: Aditya Ahmad, A Gift
 Special Mention: With History In A Room Filled With People With Funny Names 4 (Korakrit Arunanondchai, Thailand)

Youth Jury & Critics Programme:
 Youth Critic Award: Ryan Lim (Nanyang Technological University)
 Youth Jury Prize: A Gift (Aditya Ahmad, Indonesia)

Southeast Asian Film Lab:
 Most Promising Project: Never Been Kissed (Dao Thi Minh Trang, Vietnam)

Audience Choice Award:
One Cut of the Dead (Shinichiro Ueda, Japan)

Cinema Legend Award:
 Joan Chen

Honorary Award:
 Rithy Panh

2019 Silver Screen Awards
Asian Feature Film Category:
Best Film: Scales (Shahad Ameen, Saudi Arabia/United Arab Emirates/Iraq)
Best Director: Oren Gerner, Africa
Best Performance: Kristoffer King, Verdict
Special Mention: Passed by Censor (Serhat Karaaslan, Turkey/Germany/France)

Southeast Asian Short Film Category:
 Best Southeast Asian Short Film: I’m Not Your F***ing Stereotype (Hesome Chemamah, Thailand)
 Best Singapore Short Film: Adam, Shoki Lin
 Best Director: Zaw Bo Bo Hein, Sick
 Special Mention: California Dreaming (Sreylin Meas, Cambodia)

Youth Jury & Critics Programme:
 Youth Jury Prize: Sweet, Salty (Ngot, Man) (Duong Dieu Linh, Vietnam/Singapore)

Southeast Asian Film Lab:
 Most Promising Project: Amoeba (Tan Siyou, Singapore)

Audience Choice Award:
Unteachable (Yong Shu Ling, Singapore)

Cinema Legend Award:
 Yao Chen

Honorary Award:
 Takashi Miike

2020 Silver Screen Awards
Asian Feature Film Category:
Best Film: Milestone (Ivan Ayr, India)
Best Director: Dea Kulumbegashvili, Beginning
Best Performance: Suvinder Vicky, Milestone

Southeast Asian Short Film Category:
 Best Southeast Asian Short Film: Tellurian Drama (Riar Rizaldi, Indonesia)
 Best Singapore Short Film: Here Is Not There, Nelson Yeo
 Best Director: Lin Htet Aung, Estate
 Special Mention: Red Aninsri; Or, Tiptoeing On The Still Trembling Berlin Wall (Ratchapoom Boonbunchachoke, Thailand)

Youth Jury & Critics Programme:
 Youth Jury Prize: The Unseen River (Phạm Ngọc Lân, Vietnam/Laos)
 Young Critic Award: Nicole Wong Kar Mun (Executive, Checkpoint Theatre)

Southeast Asian Film Lab:
 Most Promising Project: Baby Jackfruit Baby Guava (Nong Nhat Quang, Vietnam)
 Fellowship Prize: Tropical Rain, Death-Scented Kiss (Charlotte Hong Bee Her, Singapore)

Audience Choice Award:
Sementara (Chew Chia Shao Min and Joant Úbeda, Singapore)

2021 Silver Screen Awards
Asian Feature Film Category:
Best Film: Hit the Road (Panah Panahi, Iran)
Best Director: P.S Vinothraj, Pebbles
Best Performance: Tolepbergen Baissakalov, Fire

Southeast Asian Short Film Category:
 Best Southeast Asian Short Film: The Men Who Wait (Trương Minh Quý, France/Singapore)
 Best Singapore Short Film: {if your bait can sing the wild one will come} Like Shadows Through Leaves, Lucy Davis
 Best Director: Mark Chua, Lam Li Shuen, A Man Trembles
 Special Mention: February 1st (Mo Mo, Leila Macaire, France/Myanmar)

Youth Jury & Critics Programme:
 Youth Jury Prize: Grandma's Broken Leg (Huỳnh Công Nhớ, Vietnam)
 Young Critic Award: Tracey Toh Xiu Si

Southeast Asian Film Lab:
 Most Promising Project: The Itinerant (Ukrit Sa-Nguanhai, Thailand)
 Fellowship Prize: Rafael (Paul Rembert, Philippines) 
 Fellowship Prize: Daughter Of The Mountain God (Pham Hoang Minh Thy, Vietnam)

Audience Choice Award:
Some Women (Quen Wong, Singapore)

2022 Silver Screen Awards
Asian Feature Film Category:
 Best Film: Autobiography (Makbul Mubarak, Indonesia/France/Germany/Poland/Singapore/Philippines/Qatar)
 Best Director: Laha Mebow, Gaga
 Best Performance: Zukhara Sanzysbay, Convenience Store
 Special Mention: Arnold Is a Model Student (Sorayos Prapapan, Thailand/Singapore/France/Netherlands/Philippines)

Southeast Asian Short Film Category:
 Best Southeast Asian Short Film: Vania on Lima Street (Bayu Prihantoro Filemon, Indonesia)
 Best Singapore Short Film: Smoke Gets in Your Eyes, Alvin Lee
 Best Director: Le Lam Vien, FIX ANYTHING
 Best Performance: Bopha Oul, Further and Further Away
 Special Mention: Dikit (Gabriela Serrano, Philippines)

Youth Critics Programme:
 Young Critic Award: Benjamin Yap Kee Siang

Southeast Asian Film Lab:
 Most Promising Project: A Ballad of Long Hair (Giovanni Rustanto, Indonesia)
 Fellowship Prize: Please Bear with Me (Gabriela Serrano, Philippines) 
 Fellowship Prize: The Burning Land (Rein Maychaelson, Philippines)
 Special Mention: Every Mall Burns the Same (Gladys Ng, Singapore)

Audience Choice Award:
 How to Save a Dead Friend (Marusya Syroechkovskaya, Sweden/Norway/France/Germany)

Outstanding Contribution to Southeast Asian Cinema Award: 
 In-Docs (Indonesia)

References

External links
Official Site

Singapore International Film Festival
Singapore International Film Festival
Singapore International Film Festival
 List